María Elena Briceño Jiménez (born 25 February 1985) is a Venezuelan road and track cyclist. She participated at the 2008 and 2012 UCI Road World Championships.

Major results

2006
 1st  Road race, National Road Championships
2007
 3rd Road race, National Road Championships
 10th Time trial, Pan American Road and Track Championships
2008
 2nd Road race, National Road Championships
2009
 National Road Championships
1st  Road race
2nd Time trial
2010
 2nd  Team pursuit, South American Games
2011
 National Road Championships
3rd Road race
3rd Time trial
2012
 National Road Championships
2nd Time trial
3rd Road race
2014
 5th Copa Federación Venezolana de Ciclismo
2015
 2nd Scratch, Copa Venezuela 
 3rd Time trial, National Road Championships
 9th Copa Federación Venezolana de Ciclismo
2016
 Copa Venezuela
3rd Individual pursuit
3rd Points race
2018
 National Road Championships
3rd Road race
3rd Time trial
2019
 2nd Time trial, National Road Championships
 2nd Overall Tour Femenino de Venezuela II
 5th Tour Femenino de Venezuela I
2021
 3rd Road race, National Road Championships

References

External links

Venezuelan female cyclists
Living people
Place of birth missing (living people)
South American Games silver medalists for Venezuela
South American Games medalists in cycling
1985 births
Competitors at the 2010 South American Games
21st-century Venezuelan women
20th-century Venezuelan women